Maryborough Post Office may refer to:

 Maryborough Post Office (Queensland)
 Maryborough Post Office (Victoria)